Xestoso is one of four parroquias, a parish (administrative division) in Villanueva de Oscos, a municipality within the province and autonomous community of Asturias, in northern Spain.

Villages and hamlets
 Batribán
 Cotarelo
 Regodesebes
 Salgueiras
 As Toleiras
 Xestoso
 Arcaxo
 El Tesouro
 A Casilla
 Morán
 El Xeixo

Notable attractions
 Capilla (chapel) de la Virgen del Carmen in Gestoso
 Capilla (chapel) de Cimadevilla
 Iglesia (church) de San José de Gestoso

Referencies 

Parishes in Villanueva de Oscos